Kensington is a passenger railroad station located at 10417 Howard Avenue in Kensington, Maryland, United States. Built by the Baltimore and Ohio Railroad (B&O), the Kensington station is currently served by MARC Train's Brunswick Line. There are fifteen weekday scheduled stops at Kensington, as well as one flag stop scheduling on Fridays.

Station layout
Kensington station has a former B&O station master's house. The building is open during the Kensington Farmers Market, which is held in the station parking lot. Inside there is an old stove, waiting area, and restrooms. Tickets can be purchased from a self-service machine. During the Kensington Labor Day Parade, CSX Transportation, which currently owns the railroad line, offers free souvenirs. There is also a small model train layout. The platform is a low level concrete platform. On the other side there is a covered waiting area and some benches. Elaborate safety measures can be found on the crosswalk between the platforms leading to the station entrance that include crossbuck signs with warning bells, highway signs, and pedestrian signals. The station is not compliant with the Americans with Disabilities Act of 1990, lacking raised platforms for level boarding.

History 
The B&O completed construction of the Metropolitan Branch through Montgomery County in 1873. The line connected Washington, D.C. to Cumberland, Maryland and points west.

Initially the settlement around the railroad line was known as Knowles Station. The town was incorporated in 1894 and was named Kensington at that time. The B&O station was designed by architect Ephraim Francis Baldwin and opened in 1891.  From 1893 to 1935, the station was used as a terminal for the Kensington Electric Railway and offered passenger service to Chevy Chase, Maryland. The station is a contributing property to the Kensington Historic District.

Gallery

See also
 Metropolitan Subdivision
 Washington D.C. Streetcars (Maryland)

References

Further reading
B&O Train Station — Landmarks — Kensington Historical Society
"History of the Town of Kensington" — Town of Kensington
Kensington at the Maryland Municipal League

External links

10417 Howard Avenue. The Kensington B & O Train Station — North Kensington — Historic Photos — Kensington Historical Society
Kensington Farmer’s Market. Located at the Historic Train Station at 10417 Howard Ave. — Town of Kensington
MARC services map
MARC Brunswick Line schedule
MARC stations list
Ride-On Bus Service - official site
Station from Google Maps Street View

Brunswick Line
Former Amtrak stations in Maryland
Historic district contributing properties in Maryland
Kensington, Maryland
MARC Train stations
Railway stations in the United States opened in 1891
Former Baltimore and Ohio Railroad stations
Railway stations in Montgomery County, Maryland
National Register of Historic Places in Montgomery County, Maryland
Railway stations on the National Register of Historic Places in Maryland